The 1981 Coppa Italia Final was the final of the 1980–81 Coppa Italia. The match was played over two legs on 13 and 17 June 1981 between Roma and Torino. Roma won 4–2 on penalties after the matches ended 2–2 on aggregate.

First leg

Second leg

References
Coppa Italia 1980/81 statistics at rsssf.com
 https://www.calcio.com/calendario/ita-coppa-italia-1980-1981-finale/2/
 https://www.worldfootball.net/schedule/ita-coppa-italia-1980-1981-finale/2/

Coppa Italia Finals
Coppa Italia Final 1981
Coppa Italia Final 1981
Coppa Italia Final 1981